Justice Amoa, popularly known as Patapaa is an African hiplife musician and a songwriter based in Ghana .

He is the first child in a family of three children and was born in Swedru, Central Region. He is best known for his 2017 debut single "One Corner",  which was nominated for the Most Popular Song of the Year category and song of the Year category at the 2018 Vodafone Ghana Music Awards.

“One Corner” was also nominated as the Song of the Year at the 2018 Vodafone Ghana music awards.
In 2018, he was featured on an African international hit titled Akwaaba by one of Ghana's finest producers Guiltybeatz including Mr Eazi and Pappy Kojo.

Awards and nominations 

|-
|2018
|One Corner
|Song of the Year
|
|-
|2018
|"One Corner" 
|Hip - Life Song of the Year
|
|-

References 

Ghanaian musicians
Living people
Year of birth missing (living people)